Ricardo Santana is a Paralympian athlete from Venezuela competing mainly in category T12 sprint events.

Ricardo has competed and medalled at three Paralympics.  His first was in Sydney in 2000 where having competed in the T13 100m and 400m he picked up a bronze medal in the T13 200m.  In the 2004 Summer Paralympics in Athens having been reclassified into T12 won a silver medal in the 100m and a bronze in the 200m and was part of the Venezuelan team that finished third in the T11-13 4 × 100 m relay.  His third appearance was in 2008 Summer Paralympics in Beijing where he failed to win any medals in the T12 100m or 200m but did win a silver as part of the T11-13 4 × 100 m team.

External links
 profile on paralympic.org

Paralympic athletes of Venezuela
Athletes (track and field) at the 2000 Summer Paralympics
Athletes (track and field) at the 2004 Summer Paralympics
Athletes (track and field) at the 2008 Summer Paralympics
Paralympic silver medalists for Venezuela
Paralympic bronze medalists for Venezuela
Venezuelan male sprinters
Living people
Medalists at the 2000 Summer Paralympics
Medalists at the 2004 Summer Paralympics
Medalists at the 2008 Summer Paralympics
Year of birth missing (living people)
Paralympic medalists in athletics (track and field)
20th-century Venezuelan people
21st-century Venezuelan people
Visually impaired sprinters
Paralympic sprinters